Trikāta Parish is a constituent part of Valmiera Municipality. From 2009 until 2021, Trikāta Parish was part of the former Beverīna Municipality (formerly of Valka District, Latvia, before the July 1, 2009, administrative reform). Latvian law defines Trikāta Parish as a part of the Vidzeme region.

Trikāta, the central settlement of the parish lies approximately 17 km to the east of Valmiera, 23 km north-west of Smiltene, and 14 km south of Strenči.

Towns, villages and settlements of Trikāta Parish 
  - parish administrative center

References 

Parishes of Latvia
Castles of the Teutonic Knights
Valmiera Municipality
Vidzeme